The 2010 United States Senate election in Kentucky took place on November 2, 2010, alongside other elections to the United States Senate in other states as well as elections to the United States House of Representatives and various state and local elections. Primaries for each respective party were held on May 18, 2010. Incumbent Republican U.S. Senator Jim Bunning decided to retire instead of seeking a third term. Republican nominee Rand Paul, an ophthalmologist and son of Congressman Ron Paul, won the open seat against Kentucky Attorney General Jack Conway.

Bunning's controversies 
In early 2009, incumbent Republican U.S. Senator Jim Bunning, who won reelection by a surprisingly narrow margin in 2004 said he would need to raise $10 million for his re-election campaign. However, National Republican Senatorial Committee chairman John Cornyn pressured Bunning to retire due to concerns that he could lose a re-election bid. In July 2009, Bunning announced he would not run for re-election.

In February 2009, Senator Bunning stated that another justice could soon be appointed to the United States Supreme Court because Supreme Court Justice Ruth Bader Ginsburg, who had been diagnosed with pancreatic cancer, would be dead within nine months, creating a significant amount of controversy, which resulted in an apology from Bunning. Ginsburg would not die until 2020, outliving Senator Bunning who died in 2017.

In late May 2009, Bunning called fellow Kentucky Senator and Republican Minority Leader Mitch McConnell a "control freak" and suggested that he did not need McConnell's endorsement. He also challenged Lexington Herald Leader editor John Stamper to an arm wrestling match over a question of being "fit to serve."

Additionally, Bunning created further controversy in February 2010 when he objected to a proposal of unanimous consent for an extension of unemployment insurance, COBRA, and other federal programs, citing that this extension was not pay-as-you-go. He proposed an amendment which sought to find the funds to pay for the bill from the Stimulus Bill of 2009, and declared that he supported the unemployed, but that a bill such as this only added to the growing deficit and that it should be paid for immediately. Senator Bob Corker joined Bunning, while other senators worked to cease his objections. When Senator Jeff Merkley urged him to drop his objections to vote on a 30-day extension of benefits, Bunning responded "tough shit." Bunning finally agreed to end his objection to the bill in exchange for a vote on his amendment to pay for the package. It failed 53–43 on a procedural vote. The extension of unemployment benefits then passed by a vote of 78–19.

Republican primary

Candidates 
 Rand Paul, ophthalmologist
 Trey Grayson, Secretary of State of Kentucky
 Gurley L. Martin, World War II veteran
 Jon J. Scribner, businessman
 John Stephenson, former Kentucky Superintendent of Public Education

Campaign 
On August 20, 2009, a grassroots-planned moneybomb raised $433,509 for Rand Paul's campaign in a 24-hour period. According to Paul, this set a new record in Kentucky's political fundraising history (for a 24-hour period). Republican Liberty Caucus endorsed Paul in November 2009. On December 22, 2009, Rand Paul picked up the endorsement of Concerned Women for America. Paul embraced the Tea Party movement, and promoted "small government principles" one day after he officially entered the race for Kentucky's open seat. Paul ran a strong anti-Washington message. One commercial tied Grayson as part of the problem, noting that Grayson raised money with AIG executives in Washington. In another advertisement, Paul had also attacked Grayson as a career politician and a liar.

Grayson created a new website that attacked Paul for his "strange ideas," such as his opposition of the PATRIOT Act, and what Grayson alleged to be his support of closing down Guantanamo Bay and saying that Iran was not a threat. He also attacked Paul for being a Duke University fan. He sent out another TV ad and web video that stirred controversy by making the case that Paul believes that foreign policy decisions made prior to September 11, 2001, are partially to blame for the attacks. Paul immediately responded by launching a statewide television ad in which he expresses his "outrage at terrorists who killed 3,000 innocents" before accusing Grayson of a "lie" and a "shameful" tactic. Grayson accused the Fox News Channel of favoring Paul over him.

On May 18, 2010, Paul won the Republican nomination. After conceding the election to Paul, Grayson said, "It's time to put all differences aside, unite behind Dr. Paul, he needs our help and I for one stand ready to serve".

Endorsements 

 U.S. Senator Jim Bunning of Kentucky
 U.S. Senator Jim DeMint of South Carolina
 Former Governor Sarah Palin of Alaska
 Former Governor Mike Huckabee of Arkansas
 Congressman Ron Paul (father of Rand)
 Former Republican presidential candidate and editor-in-chief of Forbes Steve Forbes
 State Senator Dan Seum
 Editor of conservative weblog RedState Erick Erickson
 James Dobson, founder of Focus on the Family
 Cathy Bailey, Former U.S. Ambassador to Latvia
 Brooks Wicker, 3rd congressional district candidate
 James Edwards, host of The Political Cesspool
 Concerned Women for America
 Downsize DC Foundation
 Americans For Prosperity
 FreedomWorks
 Gun Owners of America
 Republican Liberty Caucus
 Northern Kentucky Right to Life
 Tea Party Express
 REAGAN PAC
 Bluegrass Bulletin's Marcus Carey
 Kentucky Credit Union PAC
 Lexington Herald-Leader
 Club for Growth

 U.S. Senate Republican Minority Leader Mitch McConnell of Kentucky
 Former Vice President Dick Cheney
 Former U.S. Senator Rick Santorum of Pennsylvania
 Former Congressman Ron Lewis of Kentucky
 Former New York City Mayor Rudy Giuliani
 Congressman Hal Rogers of Kentucky
 State Senator Julie Denton
 State Senator Tom Jensen
 State Senator Vernie McGaha
 State Senator John Schickel
 State Senator Brandon Smith
 State Senator Elizabeth Tori
 State Senator Jack Westwood
 State Senator Ken Winters
 State Representative Scott Brinkman
 State Representative John "Bam" Carney
 State Representative Tim Couch
 State Representative Ronald Crimm
 State Representative Bob Deweese
 State Representative Myron Dossett
 State Representative Bill Farmer
 State Representative Mike Harmon
 State Representative Brent Housman
 State Representative Adam Koenig
 State Representative Brad Montell
 State Representative Tim Moore
 State Representative David Osborne
 State Representative Marie Rader
 State Representative Steven Rudy
 State Representative Sal Santoro
 State Representative Alecia Webb-Edgington
 State Representative Addia Wuchner
 State Representative Jill York
 Kentucky Right to Life
 The Kentucky Enquirer

Polling

Results

Democratic primary

Candidates 
 Jack Conway, Attorney General of Kentucky
 Daniel Mongiardo, Lieutenant Governor of Kentucky and nominee in 2004
 James Buckmaster, physician
 Darlene Fitzgerald Price, former U.S. Customs agent
 Maurice Sweeney, businessman

Campaign 
Mongiardo announced that he had received the endorsement of Governor Steve Beshear and raised $420,000.

Due to Conway's large margin of victory in his statewide campaign for attorney general, his fundraising ability, and the age difference between Conway and Bunning, Conway was described as a viable candidate.

Both candidates were against the Senate version of the Affordable Care Act. When Mongiardo said that "it was time to start over," he was criticized by Conway and labeled "Dr. No." Both candidates supported the final version. Attorney General Conway refused to join a lawsuit claiming that health care reform is unconstitutional.

On May 18, 2010, Conway won the Democratic nomination.

Endorsements 

 U.S. Congressmen Ben Chandler
 U.S. Congressman John Yarmuth
 Speaker of the Kentucky House of Representatives Greg Stumbo
 Kentucky Finance/Administration Cabinet Secretary Jonathan Miller
 Louisville Mayor Jerry Abramson
 Former U.S. Senator and former Governor of Kentucky Wendell Ford
 Former Governor of Kentucky John Brown
 Kentucky State Auditor Crit Luallen
 The Courier-Journal
 The Kentucky Enquirer
 Lexington Herald-Leader

 Governor Steve Beshear
 State Senator and former Governor Julian Carroll
 State Senator Perry Clark
 State Senator Denise Harper-Angel
 State Senator Walter Blevins
 State Senator Tim Shaughnessy
 State Senator Gerald Neal
 Former State Senator David Karem

Polling

Results 

The primary race was extremely close with Conway narrowly prevailing by just over 4,000 votes. The race remained in doubt for much of the night. Finally with 99% of the vote counted the Associated Press declared Conway the winner. Mongiardo called Conway to concede at 10:08 P.M. EST. Mongiardo congratulated Conway and pledged him his full support for the general election. In terms of the break down of the results, Conway ran up margins in Jefferson County home of Louisville, and Fayette County home of Lexington. In terms of more rural counties Mongiardo and Conway split the vote. Conway performed well in central Kentucky, while Mongiardo performed well in coal country in east Kentucky and farm country in western Kentucky. In the end Conway's performance in the states most populated county, Jefferson County proved to be just enough to carry him to victory. The primary race was also notable because both Conway and Mongiardo received more votes than Republican Rand Paul.

General election

Candidates 
 Rand Paul (R), ophthalmologist and political activist
 Jack Conway (D), Attorney General
 Billy Ray Wilson (independent write-in)

Kentucky's ballot access requirements allow Republicans and Democrats to run for office with two signatures, but require minor parties and independents to collect at least 5,000 signatures. The filing deadline for minor party and independent candidates was on August 10, and no candidate filed.

Some speculate that the reason why no minor party or independent candidate filed is because Paul's candidacy helped discourage it. The Libertarian Party of Kentucky held its nominating convention for 2010 elections and failed to nominate a candidate for the U.S. Senate, as no one stepped forward to seek nomination to that office. Despite comments from some observers that Paul espouses libertarian beliefs, the Kentucky Libertarian Party issued an official press release stating "Rand Paul is not a libertarian" and detailing the differences between Paul's beliefs and libertarian principles. Similarly, the Constitution Party of Kentucky avoided the Senate race ostensibly because of Rand Paul's presence in that race and perhaps because of his more minarchist stance than Trey Grayson, especially if the latter had been the nominee.

Billy Ray Wilson, an independent of London, filed as a write-in candidate.

Campaign 
Conway began the race trailing Paul, but as he attacked his opponent's positions on social-welfare and criminal-justice policies, the polls began to tighten. Conway agreed to run an advertisement that linked Paul's policy stances to a college prank in which Paul reportedly demanded that a female classmate worship a bong named "Aqua Buddha." Independent political analysts in Kentucky quickly warned that Conway would regret his decision. The ad's focus on religion led critics, including not just Republicans but also some liberals such as Hardball's Chris Matthews, to charge that Conway was improperly questioning Paul's faith, to which Conway countered that the ad was intended to question Paul's "judgment."  Nonetheless, Conway swiftly dropped again in the polls, a decline from which he never recovered. Conway ceased his defense of the commercial after the election, admitting that running it had been a mistake; he claimed that he had done so only reluctantly at the urging of national advisers despite finding it "harsh as mule's breath."

Conway saw one last opportunity before his final debate with Paul.  One of Rand Paul's supporters stomped on a MoveOn activist after she approached Paul's vehicle, and a video of the event was later used in a Conway TV commercial. Paul and Conway condemned the attack and the supporter was banned from campaign events.

The campaign attracted $8.5 million in contributions from outside groups, of which $6 million was spent to help Rand Paul and $2.5 million to help Conway. This money influx was in addition to the money spent by the candidates themselves: $6 million by Paul and $4.7 million by Conway.

Paul was endorsed by The Kentucky Enquirer, The Richmond Register, and the Bowling Green Daily News; as well as by the National Federation of Independent Business, Council for Citizens Against Government Waste, National Right to Life, US Chamber of Commerce, National Vietnam and Gulf War Veterans Coalition, Mike Huckabee, and Tony Perkins/FRC Action PAC.

Conway was endorsed by the Courier-Journal and the Lexington Herald Leader.

Debates 

There were 5 televised debates between the two candidates. The first debate on October 3, 2010, which was moderated by Chris Wallace, seemed to focus on President Obama's decisions during his 2 years as president. Paul stated, "I think his agenda is wrong for America. I will stand up against President Obama's agenda." Conway responded, "I am a proud Democrat. I'm certainly not going to be on the left of Barack Obama." At the time of the debate, the election's polls indicated the race was a dead heat.

Predictions

Fundraising

Polling

Results

References

Further reading

External links 
 Kentucky State Board of Elections
 U.S. Congress candidates for Kentucky (Archive) at Project Vote Smart
 Kentucky U.S. Senate 2010 from OurCampaigns.com
 Campaign contributions from Open Secrets
 2010 Kentucky Senate General Election: Rand Paul (R) vs Jack Conway (D) graph of multiple polls from Pollster.com
 Election 2010: Kentucky Senate from Rasmussen Reports
 2010 Kentucky Senate Race from Real Clear Politics
 2010 Kentucky Senate Race from CQ Politics
 Race profile from The New York Times
 Kentucky Senate election coverage from The Courier-Journal, Louisville
 Kentucky Senate election coverage from the Lexington Herald-Leader, including Voter's Guide for Democratic  and Republican  candidates
Debates
 Kentucky Senate Democratic Primary Debate, C-SPAN, May 3, 2010
 Kentucky Senate Republican Primary Debate, C-SPAN, May 10, 2010
 Kentucky Senate Candidate Forum, C-SPAN, July 22, 2010
 Kentucky Senate Debate, Fox News Sunday, October 3, 2010, full transcript
Official campaign websites (Archived)
 Jack Conway for U.S. Senate
 Rand Paul for U.S. Senate

2010 Kentucky elections
Kentucky
2010
Rand Paul